Joel Miller (born May 10, 1988) is an American auto racing driver from Hesperia, California.

Racing career

Miller began his career in karting winning the Stars of Karting Western ICA Championship in 2005 and the Stars of Karting ICA National Championship in 2006. Joel Miller became one of the few Americans to compete alongside Factory Tony Kart's program in the SKUSA and Stars of Karting Championships. Miller began racing cars in 2004 in the Pacific F2000 Championship, finishing on the podium in 3 races. By 2006, Miller had received the Skip Barber Racing National Series Scholarship to compete a full season in the 2007 Skip Barber National Championship. In 2007 he won the Skip Barber National Championship and was awarded the Team USA Scholarship participating in the Formula Palmer Audi Autumn Trophy, in which he finished 10th. 2008 saw him compete in the Star Mazda Series for JDC MotorSports where he captured, 1 win, 2 poles, and 7 podiums on his way to runner-up honors in the overall championship. He returned to Star Mazda in 2009 but only captured 3 podiums and finished 5th in the points, due to a heavy karting schedule. He made his Firestone Indy Lights debut in April 2010 for Andersen Racing, the third race of the season after extensive pre-season testing with the team, finishing 11th at the Long Beach Grand Prix after a gearbox failure. Miller returned in August 2010 to compete in his second Firestone Indy Lights race alongside Bryan Herta Autosport at Infineon Raceway for the Carneros 100 to finish 9th after starting from 16th on the grid. Miller had qualified in 11th for the race, however an engine change gave Miller's team a penalty starting him at the back of the grid.

Joel Miller also launched The Joel Miller Indy Racing Experience, an event that took place on August 15, 2010 in Santa Cruz, CA in which helped raise money for his second Firestone Indy Lights race at Infineon. His management firm  brought in several performing artists, exotic cars, motocross demonstrations, celebrities, and a poker tournament for the event.

After a few seasons of one-off races in Firestone Indy Lights, Continental Tire Sports Car Challenge, and the SCCA Pro Racing Playboy Mazda MX-5 Cup, Miller returned to full-time racing in 2013 driving for SpeedSource  in the Grand American Rolex Series, in a GX class Mazda6 sedan shared with Tristan Nunez.  The pair scored five wins and eight podiums in twelve races.  For 2014, Miller continues to co-drive with Nunez as the SpeedSource team moved to the Prototype class in the Tudor United SportsCar Championship.  Their new car is a carbon fiber LMP2 class Lola  coupe with Mazda Skyactiv diesel power.

American open–wheel racing
(key) (Races in bold indicate pole position; races in italics indicate fastest lap)

Star Mazda Championship

IMSA WeatherTech SportsCar Championship series results

† Points only counted towards the Michelin Endurance Cup, and not the overall LMP3 Championship.

References

External links
Official Website
Official Event Website
Joel Miller career statistics at Driver Database

1988 births
Indy Lights drivers
Indy Pro 2000 Championship drivers
Formula Palmer Audi drivers
Living people
People from Hesperia, California
Racing drivers from California
24 Hours of Daytona drivers
Rolex Sports Car Series drivers
WeatherTech SportsCar Championship drivers
Bryan Herta Autosport drivers
JDC Motorsports drivers
Michelin Pilot Challenge drivers